Fixer (Alternative Arabic title فكسر) is a British-Lebanese action comedy television series created by Firas Abou Fakher and Daniel Habib as a Shahid Original for MBC Group. It premiered on 8 December 2020.

Premise
Tony Tabet is a celebrity fixer living in Beirut. Whenever an Arab celebrity has a problem, he's the solution. Now he wants out to reconnect with his son and leave the business behind. He's got one month left on the job, but doubts he can ever really leave.

Cast

Badih Abou Chakra as Tony Tabet
Diamand Bou Abboud  as Sarah
Wissam Saliba as Mike
Sara Abi Kanaan as Maya
Maritta Hallani as herself

Production
Fixer was commissioned from Last Floor Productions a Shahid Original for MBC Group’s Shahid streaming platform, the largest in the Middle East. Filming took place in Beirut. It is the second Shahid Original created by Last Floor Productions.

Release date
Fixer was released on 8 December 2020 on Shahid.

References

External links
 

Arabic television series
Action comedy television series
2020 British television series debuts
21st-century Lebanese television series debuts